Paraclinus rubicundus is a species of labrisomid blennie native to the Atlantic coast of Brazil where it inhabits algae-covered reefs at depths of from near the surface to .  This species can reach a length of  SL.

References

rubicundus
Fish of Brazil
Endemic fauna of Brazil
Southeastern South American coastal fauna
Fish described in 1913